Elachista curufinella is a moth of the family Elachistidae. It is found in Canada, where it has been recorded from Alberta.

References

curufinella
Moths described in 1999
Moths of North America
Organisms named after Tolkien and his works